The 1940 Orange Bowl was a college football postseason bowl game between the Georgia Tech Yellow Jackets and the Missouri Tigers.

Background
The Yellow Jackets tied for first in the Southeastern Conference, their first conference title since winning the Southern Conference in 1928, which was also their last bowl appearance. Missouri won the Missouri Valley Intercollegiate Athletic Association title for the first time since 1927. This was Missouri's first bowl game since 1924.

Game summary
Paul Christman gave the Tigers a 7–0 lead on his touchdown plunge, but Howard Ector responded with a touchdown run of his own to culminate a 63-yard drive and tie the score at 7 at the end of one quarter. Rob Ison dashed for the second Jacket touchdown to make it 14–7. Early Wheby made it 21–7 on his touchdown gallop of 34 yards as Georgia Tech won their first Orange Bowl.

Aftermath
The Yellow Jackets have made six subsequent appearances in the over 70-year span since this game, including three in the next 12 years. The Tigers returned to the Orange Bowl 20 years later.

Statistics

References

Orange Bowl
Orange Bowl
Georgia Tech Yellow Jackets football bowl games
Missouri Tigers football bowl games
January 1940 sports events
Orange Bowl